Günter Böhme (M 16, 1913 – M 24, 1988) was a German politician of the Christian Democratic Union (CDU) and former member of the German Bundestag.

Life 
From 1969 to 1972 he was a member of the German Bundestag. He was elected via the state list of the CDU North Rhine-Westphalia.

Literature

References

1925 births
2006 deaths
Members of the Bundestag for North Rhine-Westphalia
Members of the Bundestag 1969–1972
Members of the Bundestag for the Christian Democratic Union of Germany